Aspidiotina is a subtribe of armored scale insects.

Genera

Acutaspis
Affirmaspis
Aonidiella
Aspidaspis
Aspidioides
Aspidiotus
Avidovaspis
Banahaoa
Cephalaspidiotus
Chemnaspidiotus
Chentraspis
Chinaspis
Chortinaspis
Chrysomphalus
Clavaspidiotus
Clavaspis
Crenulaspidiotus
Cryptophyllaspsis
Diaspidiotus
Diclavaspis
Dynaspidiotus
Ephedraspis
Gonaspidiotus
Greenoidea
Helaspis
Hemiberlesia
Hypaspidiotus
Lindingaspis
Loranthaspis
Marginaspis
Megaspidiotus
Melanaspis
Metaspidiotus
Monaonidiella
Morganella
Murataspis
Mycetaspis
Neoclavaspis
Neoleonardia
Nigridiaspis
Nuculaspis
Obtusaspis
Octaspidiotus
Palinaspis
Phaspis
Pseudischnaspis
Pseudomelanaspis
Pygidiaspis
Quadraspidiotus
Reclavaspis
Rungaspis
Saharaspis
Sakalavaspis
Schizaspis
Spinaspidiotus
Sudanaspis
Taiwanaspidiotus
Temnaspidiotus
Tsimanaspis
Tsugaspidiotus
Unaspidiotus
Varicaspis

References